Saad Altaf (born 25 December 1983) is a Pakistani first-class cricketer who has played for several domestic teams in Pakistan. In November 2017, bowling for Rawalpindi, he took figures of 8 wickets for 62 runs in the first innings and 8 wickets for 79 runs in the second innings against Federally Administered Tribal Areas in the 2017–18 Quaid-e-Azam Trophy. His match figures of 16 wickets for 141 runs was the best in a first-class match in Pakistan.

He was the joint-leading wicket-taker for Rawalpindi in the 2018–19 Quaid-e-Azam Trophy, with thirty-two dismissals in seven matches.

References

External links
 

1983 births
Living people
Pakistani cricketers
Islamabad cricketers
Attock Group cricketers
Cricketers from Islamabad
Islamabad Leopards cricketers
Federally Administered Tribal Areas cricketers
Rawalpindi cricketers